Yanthungo Patton, also known as Y. Patton, is an Indian politician from Nagaland and current Deputy Chief Minister of the Indian state of Nagaland serving in the NDPP-BJP administration. He is the BJP MLA from Tyüi Assembly Constituency and was Home Minister in the NPF-led government.

On the 2021 Nagaland killings, Patton as the deputy CM of Nagaland tweeted,Oting's (Mon) disturbing and tragic incident in which civilians were killed will be thoroughly investigated and justice will be served. Condolences to the bereaved families and prayers for the speedy recovery of the injured. In the wake of the tragedy, I urge peace from everyone!

References 

Living people
21st-century Indian politicians
Bharatiya Janata Party politicians from Nagaland
Year of birth missing (living people)
Nagaland MLAs 2018–2023
Deputy chief ministers of Nagaland